Chenxi County is a county in Hunan Province, China, it is under the administration of Huaihua prefecture-level City.

Located on the north of the province, it is adjacent to the north of the city proper of Huaihua. The county is bordered to the north by Yuanling County, to the east by Xupu County, to the south by Zhongfang County and Hecheng District, to the west by Mayang and Luxi Counties. The county has nine towns and 14 townships under its jurisdiction, the county seat is Chenyang.

Climate

References
www.xzqh.org

External links 

 
County-level divisions of Hunan
Huaihua